Richard Henry Mills (born July 19, 1929) is a Senior United States district judge of the United States District Court for the Central District of Illinois.

Education and career

Born in Beardstown, Illinois, Mills received a Bachelor of Arts degree from Illinois College in 1951, and a Juris Doctor from Mercer University School of Law in 1957. He was in the United States Army Reserve, JAG Corps from 1952 to 1954, achieving the rank of colonel. He was in private practice in Virginia, Illinois from 1957 to 1966, and was a state's attorney of Cass County, Illinois from 1960 to 1964. He was a circuit judge of the Eighth Judicial Circuit of Illinois in Virginia from 1966 to 1976, and then a justice of the Appellate Court of Illinois, Fourth District in Springfield from 1976 to 1985. He received a Master of Laws from the University of Virginia School of Law in 1982.

Federal judicial service

On June 25, 1985, Mills was nominated by President Ronald Reagan to a seat on the United States District Court for the Central District of Illinois vacated by Judge J. Waldo Ackerman. Mills was confirmed by the United States Senate on July 19, 1985, and received his commission on July 22, 1985. He assumed senior status on October 7, 1997.

References

Sources
 

1929 births
Living people
Illinois College alumni
Illinois lawyers
Illinois state court judges
United States Army officers
United States Army Judge Advocate General's Corps
Mercer University alumni
Judges of the United States District Court for the Central District of Illinois
People from Beardstown, Illinois
District attorneys in Illinois
Military personnel from Illinois
United States district court judges appointed by Ronald Reagan
20th-century American judges
University of Virginia School of Law alumni
People from Virginia, Illinois
21st-century American judges